Kurtis Townsend is an American basketball coach who is an assistant men's basketball coach at the University of Kansas.  Townsend was an assistant on the Jayhawks 2007–08 and 2021-22 NCAA national championship team.

Playing career
Townsend is a 1982 graduate of Western Kentucky University, where he completed his bachelor's degree in recreation and played point guard from 1978–80. The team won the 1980 Ohio Valley Conference championship and earned a bid in the 1980 NCAA Division I men's basketball tournament where they lost in the first round to Virginia Tech in an overtime game.

Prior to Western Kentucky, Townsend spent two seasons playing at Menlo Junior College in California.

After college, Townsend played one season for the Montana Golden Nuggets of the CBA.

Coaching career
Townsend had coaching positions at Miami, USC, and Michigan early in his career. He joined Kansas as an assistant in 2004. In his tenure at Kansas he has won 2 National Championships. Michigan, Eastern Kentucky and Cal. In the 2022–23 season, Townsend and head coach Bill Self were suspended for 4 games for recruiting violations.

Personal life
Townsend resides in Lawrence, Kansas with his wife and his five children. He is the brother of former NBA player Raymond Townsend.

References

External links
Kansas Jayhawks bio

Year of birth missing (living people)
Living people
American men's basketball coaches
American men's basketball players
California Golden Bears men's basketball coaches
Eastern Kentucky Colonels men's basketball coaches
Junior college men's basketball players in the United States
Kansas Jayhawks men's basketball coaches
Miami Hurricanes men's basketball coaches
Michigan Wolverines men's basketball coaches
USC Trojans men's basketball coaches
Western Kentucky Hilltoppers basketball players